Orthoprosopa margarita is a species of hoverfly in the family Syrphidae.

Distribution
New Guinea.

References

Eristalinae
Insects described in 1972
Diptera of Australasia
Taxa named by F. Christian Thompson